Jesus College, Oxford, the first Protestant college at the University of Oxford, was founded by Elizabeth I in 1571 at the instigation of a Welsh clergyman, Hugh Price.  The royal charter issued by Elizabeth appointed a Principal and various Fellows, Scholars and Commissioners: the Fellows to educate the Scholars and to run the college, under the overall direction of the Principal; and the Commissioners to draw up statutes for the governance of the college, its officers and servants, and the management of the college property. The college was founded to help with the increased numbers of Welsh students at Oxford, and the founding Fellows included a number of individuals with links to Wales. The Commissioners included prominent individuals such as William Cecil, Lord Burghley, the Principal Secretary of State.  The charter also gave land and buildings in Oxford to the new college.

Whilst the foundation process of the college started in 1571, it took more than fifty years and a further two charters, one in 1589 from Elizabeth and one in 1622 from her successor, James I, to complete the process.  These further charters were necessary because neither the Commissioners appointed by the 1571 charter nor those appointed by the 1589 charter fulfilled their allotted task of drawing up statutes. During this time, Griffith Powell (one of the Fellows who was pressing for statutes to be drawn up) concluded that successive Principals were loath to have statutes, since these would limit the Principal's powers.  One Principal lost a draft copy of the statutes; the next kept the next draft in his study for several years without taking steps to have them confirmed by the Commissioners. It was not until after the 1622 charter that statutes were approved by the Commissioners and the college was fully constituted.  Despite the intention on the foundation of the college, none of the charters made special provision for Welsh students, although the students were predominantly Welsh from the outset.

Background to the foundation of the college
Jesus College was the first Protestant college to be founded at the University of Oxford, and it is the only Oxford college to date from Elizabeth's reign. It was the first new Oxford college since 1555, in the reign of Mary, when Trinity College and St John's College were founded as Roman Catholic colleges. The opening phrases of the charter, translated from the original Latin, have been noted as referring to the recent ecclesiastical changes in stating the purposes for which the college was founded:

Education in Wales had been stimulated by the foundation of grammar schools during the reigns of Henry VIII and Edward VI: King Henry VIII Grammar School in Abergavenny and Christ College, Brecon were established in the 1540s, and Friars School, Bangor dates from 1557. However, despite the numbers of Welsh students coming to Oxford University as a result, there was no special provision for Welshmen before 1571.  A Welsh clergyman, Hugh Price, therefore petitioned Elizabeth to found a college at Oxford "that he might bestow his estate of the maintenance of certain scholars of Wales to be trained up in good letters." Whatever Price's wishes, and despite the links that he and many of the founding Fellows had with Wales, neither the 1571 charter nor any of the later charters limited entry to the college to Welshmen. Nevertheless, the college students were predominantly Welsh from the outset, and the college became "the pinnacle of the academic ambition of the young men of Wales".

The charters

Jesus College came into being when Elizabeth issued a charter dated 27 June 1571. The charter named a Principal (David Lewis), eight Fellows, eight Scholars and eight Commissioners. The eight Scholars named in the 1571 charter appear to have had nothing more than a purely notional connection to the college. Five of them are known to have studied at Merchant Taylors' School and Cambridge University, with four taking up scholarships in Greek at Pembroke Hall, Cambridge. The Commissioners were required to draw up statutes, which had to be approved by a majority of them. The Commissioners included Nicholas Bacon (Lord Keeper of the Great Seal), William Cecil, Lord Burghley (Principal Secretary of State) and Gilbert Gerard (Attorney General) – three "political heavyweights".  The charter also gave to the new college the site and buildings of White Hall, located on Market Street and Ship Street – the college still occupies this site today. White Hall, which had closed in 1570, was one of the academic halls associated with the university – these were institutions that offered accommodation for students, but little in the way of teaching, and they were disappearing as the collegiate system at Oxford grew.

It is highly decorated with Tudor designs and motifs, with its style being similar to that of books of hours. Elizabeth is depicted in the opening illuminated letter, seated on a blue throne in robes of scarlet trimmed with ermine, and holding an orb and sceptre. It has been suggested by the art historian Roy Strong that the image is based on the work of Levina Teerlinc, a Flemish miniaturist. The border is decorated with floral and heraldic motifs, including the Tudor rose. The Great Seal of England was used to authenticate the charter, and the remnants of the Seal are still attached to it.

As the Commissioners did not complete their task of drawing up statutes before too many of them had died to permit the remainder to act, a second charter, dated 7 July 1589, was obtained by the then Principal, Francis Bevans.  Elizabeth appointed thirteen Commissioners, any three of whom could approve the statutes, and also confirmed Bevans as Principal. Thereafter Griffith Powell, a former student of the college who had been elected to a fellowship in 1589, drafted some statutes and attempted to have them confirmed by the new Commissioners. However, neither Bevans nor his successor John Williams pressed for statutes to be confirmed.  In their absence, the Principal had an autocratic position. Powell's view was that successive Principals were "loath to have any statutes at all", since their power would be "limited" by them. Bevans took Powell's draft to his residence in Hereford, where he stayed for several years and lost the copy. In 1595, Powell took another copy to John Whitgift, Archbishop of Canterbury and chief Commissioner, who rebuked Bevans for not attempting to obtain statutes.  Whitgift passed the draft to two other Commissioners in turn, Gabriel Goodman, the Dean of Westminster, and Herbert Westphaling, Bishop of Hereford.  Westphaling signed the draft in June 1601.  With two more signatures still being required, the statutes were sent to John Herbert in 1602. However, Williams took the draft statutes away before Herbert approved them, and kept them in his study until 1609 without making further attempts to have them confirmed.

In 1609, Powell brought matters to the attention of Richard Bancroft, Archbishop of Canterbury and Chancellor of the university, and Bancroft compelled Williams to produce the statutes. Williams expelled Powell from his fellowship, but the Chancellor ordered his reinstatement.  Bancroft died in 1610, and his successor as Archbishop, George Abbot (who was not a Commissioner), found the statutes in his study and returned them to Williams, who took no further steps before his death in 1613.  Powell, who had run the college during the long absences of Bevans and who was Vice-Principal under Williams, was appointed Principal by Thomas Egerton, Lord Ellesmere, the Chancellor of the University, in 1613. However, there were by that time insufficient living Commissioners to validate the statute.  It was not until Sir Eubule Thelwall became Principal in 1621 that matters moved forward.  A third charter was obtained from James I on 1 June 1622, confirming Thelwall as Principal and nominating eight Fellows and eight Scholars.  Two Fellows (Robert Johnson and John Higginson) and two Scholars (Lancelot Andrewes and Thomas Dove) were survivors from the 1571 charter. Four of the other six Scholars in the 1622 charter are known to have been undergraduates at Jesus College at the time; the other two appear to have been relatives of the Principal, Sir Eubule Thelwall, but do not appear in the college records.  The charter also appointed new commissioners, and little time was taken in drawing up the statutes thereafter.

People named in the 1571 charter

People named in the 1589 charter

The charter of 1589 appointed 13 Commissioners – whilst Francis Bevans was confirmed as Principal, no Fellows or Scholars were appointed by this charter.

People named in the 1622 charter

References
Notes

Bibliography

Founders
Founders
Lists of people associated with the University of Oxford